Jonathan Sacoor (born 1 September 1999) is a Belgian sprinter specialising in the 400 metres.

Career
He first came to prominence early 2018, winning a bronze medal in the 4 × 400 metres relay at the 2018 World Indoor Championships in a new national indoor record of 3:02.51. Later that year, he became the first ever Belgian under-20 athletics world champion by winning the gold medal in the 400m individual race at the 2018 IAAF World U20 Championships. He then followed up this performance with a gold in the 4 × 400 metres relay at the 2018 European Athletics Championships

He is currently a member of the University of Tennessee track and field team.

His father is Mozambican, of Portuguese and Indian descent, his mother is Dutch.

International competitions

1Did not finish in the final

Personal bests
Outdoor
200 metres – 21.35 (+0.6 m/s, Huizingen 2017)
400 metres – 45.03 (Tampere, 2018)
Indoor
200 metres – 21.58 (Ghent 2018)
400 metres – 46.95 (Ghent 2018)

See also
 Belgian men's 4 × 400 metres relay team

References

External links
 

1999 births
Living people
Belgian male sprinters
European Championships (multi-sport event) gold medalists
European Athletics Championships winners
Belgian people of Dutch descent
Belgian people of Mozambican descent
Belgian people of Indian descent
Indian people of Portuguese descent
Indian people of Dutch descent
Belgian people of Portuguese descent
World Athletics Championships athletes for Belgium
World Athletics Championships medalists
Belgian Athletics Championships winners
World Athletics Indoor Championships medalists
World Athletics U20 Championships winners
Athletes (track and field) at the 2020 Summer Olympics
Olympic athletes of Belgium
Sportspeople from Namur (city)